Norstead may refer to:

Norstead (Newfoundland), a reconstructed Viking-age village and port near L'Anse aux Meadows National Historic Site, Newfoundland and Labrador, Canada
Norstead (Missouri), a reconstructed Viking-age farm settlement in Northern Missouri, United States